Textual case-based reasoning (TCBR) is a subtopic of case-based reasoning, in short CBR, a popular area in artificial intelligence. CBR suggests the ways to use past experiences to solve future similar problems, requiring that past experiences be structured in a form similar to attribute-value pairs. This leads to the investigation of textual descriptions for knowledge exploration whose output will be, in turn, used to solve similar problems.

Subareas 
Textual case-base reasoning research has focused on:

 measuring similarity between textual cases
 mapping texts into structured case representations
 adapting textual cases for reuse
 automatically generating representations.

References

External links 
 Fourth Workshop on Textual Case-Based Reasoning: Beyond Retrieval
 Textual Case-Based Reasoning Wiki 

Classification algorithms
Inductive reasoning
Natural language processing